is a 2004 made-for-TV film anthology of five short horror stories, directed by five notable Japanese film directors, which are told through a mysterious old lady in kimono on a late-night bus travelling on a long isolated mountain road.

Plot summary

Introduction: Would You Like to Hear a Scary Tale?
Introduction: Would You Like to Hear a Scary Tale? (Intorodakushon: Kowai hanashi, kikitai desu ka) 
Directed by Yoshihiro Nakamura; teleplay by Yoshihiro Nakamura and Katsuhide Suzuki

At a bus stop near Twilight Cemetery, an elegant old lady gets on a late-night bus. She turns to the bus driver and asks "Would you like to hear a scary tale?" He refuses, but she pointedly shares a tale of a bus driver who has a ghostly experience with an okiku doll during one night. At end of her tale, she looks at the camera and asks "How about you? Would you like to hear a scary tale?"

In each episode, the old lady shares a bus-related scary story with a different passenger before introducing the main story to the viewer.

Kayoko Shiraishi - Old Lady in Kimono 
(uncredited) - bus driver

Episode 1: The Spiderwoman

Directed by Yoshihiro Nakamura; teleplay by Yoshihiro Nakamura

Two magazine reporters pursue a story about a local legend of a Spider Woman. Though the magazine's circulation has shot up 20% following their dramatic articles, they have yet to find a single shred of evidence backing up their stories. Then they hear about a young girl who claims to have been attacked by the monster.

Shōzō Endō - Yamazaki 
Yoshinori Okada - Hasegawa 
Miyako Yamaguchi - Editor 
Kanako Fukaura - Tomoko 
Anri Sugihara - Akemi, schoolgirl 
Yōko Maki - schoolgirl

Episode 2: Crevices
 
Directed by Norio Tsuruta; teleplay by Naoya Takayama.

Visiting the apartment of a missing friend, a young man is startled to find every crack and crevice of the apartment's interior sealed with red tape. Upon reviewing computer and video files, it appears his friend suffered from some sort of mental breakdown wherein he was completely obsessed with the terror that someone was watching him. But how could the friend have simply disappeared? As he and the apartment manager set out to remove the massive amount of red tape, very strange things begin to occur.

Shunsuke Nakamura - Kodera 
Shigenori Yamazaki - Shimizu
Kyūsaku Shimada - Apartment manager

Episode 3: The Sacrifice
 
Directed by Kōji Shiraishi; teleplay by Kōji Shiraishi and Naoyuki Yokota

A young woman returns to her rural home from Tokyo to tend to her ailing mother. Once there, she realizes that her troubles with a co-worker stalker may have followed her to her family home. Haunted by childhood memories and the growing fear of the obsessed co-worker, she wakes in the middle of the night and discovers a terrifying sight.

Yu Yamada - Mayu Ooki 
野原可歩 - Mayu Ooki (child) 
Moro Morooka - Toshinori Ooki 
Megumi Asaoka - Shizuko Ooki
Seminosuke Murasugi - Fukuda

Episode 4: Blonde Kwaidan

Directed by Takashi Shimizu; teleplay by Takashi Shimizu.

A Japanese film executive, visiting Hollywood for the first time, is very excited about meeting genuine blondes. However, there may be one blonde in particular who is too much for him...

Tetta Sugimoto - Yoshio Ishiguro

Episode 5: Presentiment
 
Directed by Masayuki Ochiai; teleplay by Masayuki Ochiai and Toshiya Ōno.

After committing the perfect act of embezzlement, a Japanese businessman boards the elevator to make his escape. Riding with him are three unusual passengers, who slowly reveal how much they know about him and what he has done. When the elevator suddenly breaks down, his real terror begins while he's trapped with his strange company inside the elevator and the police outside.

Teruyuki Kagawa - Shigenori Fukawa
Hijiri Kojima - Woman in hat

Conclusion: Would You Like to Hear a Scary Tale?
Would You Like to Hear a Scary Tale? (Kowai hanashi, kikitai desu ka) 
Directed by Yoshihiro Nakamura; teleplay by Yoshihiro Nakamura and Katsuhide Suzuki

The old lady shares another bus-related story with a young bus passenger. At end of her tale, she reveals herself as a ghost, which terrifies the schoolgirl and the bus driver into abandoning the bus. The old lady smiles at their running into the night, and looks at camera and says "That's all the scary tales for tonight. Sweet dreams." 
 
Kayoko Shiraishi - Old Lady in Kimono as Narrator 
Yoshiyuki Morishita - bus driver 
Risa Sasaoka - schoolgirl

Notes
Produced by Ringu and Ju-On producer Ichise Taka (credited as Ichise Takashige) for the Tokyo Broadcasting System and broadcast at 9PM on 22 September 2004, through a weekly TBS show: Wednesday Première: Best J-Horror in the World TV Special: Frightening Night of Japan (水曜プレミア　世界最恐JホラーSP日本のこわい夜; Suiyō puremia: Sekai saikyō J-Horā SP: Nihon no Kowai yoru).

Dark Tales of Japan DVD was released through Geneon Entertainment K.K. (Japan)  on 1 April 2005; Genius Entertainment (US) on 25 October 2005, and Anchor Bay Entertainment UK's Dark Asia  on 27 February 2006. All instances of Would You Like to Hear a Scary Tale? are omitted from VHS and DVD versions in the English-language market.

References

External links
 

2004 films
2004 television films
Japanese television films
Films directed by Masayuki Ochiai
Japanese horror anthology films
Films directed by Yoshihiro Nakamura
TBS Television (Japan) original programming
Fiction about photography
Fiction about curses
Japanese ghost films
2004 horror films
Horror television films
2000s Japanese films